This is a list of Edgefest lineups, sorted by year. Edgefest was a rock festival that occurred annually in Canada (most frequently at Molson Park in Barrie and in Toronto) from 1987 to 2006 and from 2008 to 2015.

Line-ups

1987
Location: Molson Park, Barrie.

Date: July 1, 1987.

Teenage Head
The Pursuit of Happiness
The Saints
Blue Rodeo
Carole Pope
Breeding Ground
Images in Vogue
The Northern Pikes
Sattalites
Pukka Orchestra
The Spoons
Vis A Vis
Eight Seconds

1988
Location: Molson Park, Barrie.

Date: July 1, 1988.

Parachute Club 
The Razorbacks
The Pursuit of Happiness 
Eugene Ripper
54-40
The Mighty Lemon Drops
Manteca 
Underworld
Andrew Cash
Timbuk Three

1989
Location: Molson Park, Barrie.

Date: July 1, 1989.

Jeff Healey Band 
The Tragically Hip
Dalbello
Chalk Circle
Sass Jordan
National Velvet
Andrew Cash 
Sarah McLachlan
Spoons 
Sons of Freedom
Carole Pope 
Jeffrey Hatcher and the Big Beat

1990
Location: Molson Park, Barrie.

Date: July 1, 1990.

The Box 
Skydiggers
Lava Hay 
The Tragically Hip
Satallites 
54-40
Crash Vegas
The Pursuit of Happiness
The Northern Pikes 
The Grapes of Wrath
National Velvet

1991
Location: Molson Park, Barrie.

Date: July 1, 1991.

Blue Rodeo 
Violent Femmes
Dream Warriors
Crash Test Dummies
Skydiggers 
Spirit of the West
Teenage Head 
Bootsauce
King Apparatus 
Skaface

1992
Location: Molson Park, Barrie.

Date: July 1, 1992.

Spinal Tap 
54-40
Leslie Spit Treeo
Bootsauce
Slik Toxik 
Amanda Marshall
The Tragically Hip 
Sass Jordan
Sons of Freedom

1993
Location: Ontario Place Forum, Toronto.

Dates: July 1-2, 1993.

Rheostatics 
The Lowest of the Low
The Waltons 
Crash Vegas
The Watchmen 
hHead
Odds 
Change of Heart
Shadowy Men on a Shadowy Planet
Me Mom & Morgentaler
Corky and the Juice Pigs
Sara Craig
Wild Strawberries
Radiohead (July 2)
Ned's Atomic Dustbin (July 2)
Judybats (July 2)
Furnaceface (July 2)

1994
Location: Ontario Place Fourm, Toronto.

Date: July 1, 1994.

The Lemonheads
The Proclaimers
13 Engines
hHead
The Watchmen 
One
The Killjoys 
Toad the Wet Sprocket
Lost Dakotas 
Wild Strawberries
Brett Brothers 
King Cobb Steelie

1995
Location: Molson Amphitheatre, Toronto.

Dates: May 21 (Edgefest I), July 1 (Edgefest II), August 5 (Edgefest III).

Edgefest I:

Our Lady Peace
Elastica 
Ned's Atomic Dustbin
Blur

Edgefest II:

54-40 
The Watchmen
Odds 
Crash Vegas
Junkhouse 
Headstones
Treble Charger 
hHead

Edgefest III:

Sloan
13 Engines
Treble Charger
The Killjoys
Change of Heart
Rusty
The Super Friendz
Jale
Adam West
Sugar Ray
Mystery Machine
Monoxides

1996

Location: Molson Park, Barrie.

Date: June 30, 1996.

The Tea Party 
54-40
Our Lady Peace 
Ashley MacIsaac
I Mother Earth 
13 Engines
The Killjoys 
Big Sugar

Second Stage:

Rusty
Weeping Tile

1997
Dates: June 26 (London, Ontario), June 28 (Barrie), June 29 (Montreal), June 30 (Ottawa), August 25 (Vancouver), August 27 (Calgary), August 29 (Edmonton), August 30 (Saskatoon), September 1 (Winnipeg).

Main Stage: 
Our Lady Peace
The Tea Party
I Mother Earth
Collective Soul
Dodgy (Vancouver, Calgary, Edmonton, Saskatoon, Winnipeg) 
The Philosopher Kings (Vancouver, Calgary, Edmonton, Saskatoon, Winnipeg)
Holly McNarland (London, Barrie, Montreal, Ottawa)
Silverchair (Vancouver, Calgary, Edmonton)
BTK (Barrie, Ottawa)
The Verve Pipe (Barrie)
Groovy Aardvark (Montreal)
Plume (Montreal)
Nancy Dumais (Montreal)

Second Stage: 

Glueleg
The Age of Electric
Finger Eleven
Sara Craig (all except Montreal)
Econoline Crush (Vancouver, Calgary, Edmonton, Saskatoon, Winnipeg)
Zuckerbaby (Barrie, Ottawa)
Mollies Revenge (Barrie, Ottawa) 
Les Secretaires Volantes (Montreal)
Go Van Gogh (Montreal)
Holfader (Montreal)
Mrs. Torrance (Montreal)

Cake, Kinnie Starr and Redd Kross were originally scheduled to perform on the tour but cancelled their performances.

1998
Dates: June 29 (Ottawa), June 30 (Montreal), July 1 (Barrie), July 4 (Winnipeg), July 5 (Saskatoon), July 8 (Edmonton), July 9 (Calgary), July 11 (Vancouver).

Main Stage:

The Tea Party
Green Day
Foo Fighters
Sloan
Econoline Crush
Holly McNarland (Winnipeg, Saskatoon, Edmonton, Calgary, Vancouver)
Moist (Ottawa, Montreal, Barrie)
Bif Naked (Ottawa, Barrie, Calgary)
Local Rabbits (Vancouver)

Second Stage:

The Watchmen
Creed
Matthew Good Band
The Killjoys
Copyright (Winnipeg, Saskatoon, Edmonton, Calgary, Vancouver)
Local Rabbits (Winnipeg, Saskatoon, Edmonton, Calgary)
Sandbox (Ottawa, Montreal, Barrie, Winnipeg)
The Inbreds (Ottawa, Montreal, Barrie)
Bif Naked (Montreal, Vancouver)
Refuel (Montreal)
Rusty (Barrie)

Other bands who performed on the tour:

New Meanies (Ottawa, Montreal)
Tripping Daisy (Ottawa, Montreal) 

Lineups varied for each show. Headstones were originally scheduled to perform on the tour but ended up not performing.

1999
Dates: July 1-2 (Barrie), July 3 (Ottawa), July 7 (Winnipeg), July 9 (Calgary), July 10 (Saskatoon), July 11 (Edmonton), July 14 (Vancouver). 

Main Stage:

Moist
Matthew Good Band
Wide Mouth Mason
Big Wreck
Edwin
Hole
Silverchair
Rascalz 

The Village Stage:

Finger Eleven
Treble Charger
Serial Joe
Vertical Horizon
Len
Gob (July 1-3)
Bodega (July 1)

A show in Montreal was originally scheduled but was cancelled due to scheduling conflicts. Eve 6 were originally scheduled to perform on the tour but cancelled due to lead singer Max Collins having throat problems.

2000
Location: Molson Park, Barrie.

Date: July 1, 2000.

Main Stage:

Filter
Creed
The Tea Party
Matthew Good Band 
Goldfinger
Serial Joe
Headstones
Limblifter

The Village Stage:

3 Doors Down
The Flashing Lights
Dunk
Jet Set Satellite
Pocket Dwellers
J Englishman
Flicker
Nickelback
Odin Red

2001
Dates: July 1 (Barrie), August 18 (Vancouver), August 21 (Calgary), August 22 (Edmonton), August 25 (Toronto), August 26 (Ottawa), August 28 (Quebec City), August 29 (Montreal).

Barrie:
3 Doors Down
Bif Naked
Big Wreck
Billy Talent
Blurtonia
Beach of Trust
By Divine Right
DJ Serious
Finger Eleven
Flybanger
Gob
Joydrop
LiveonRelease
Mudmen
Project Wyze
Puddy
Rocket Science
Rubberman
Sevendust
Smoother
Staggered Crossing
Static in Stereo
The Black Halos
The Dears
The Tea Party
Tool
Tuuli

August Tour:

Blink-182
New Found Glory
Sum 41
Jimmy Eat World
Good Charlotte
Millencolin
Project Wyze
Simple Plan
Shocore
Flu (Calgary)
Crushing Jane (Edmonton)

2002
Dates: Edgefest: July 1 (Barrie). Edgefest II: July 23 (Edmonton), August 22 (Ottawa), September 1 (Grand Bend), September 2 (Montreal), September 13 (London), September 13 (Vancouver), September 13-14 (Halifax).

Edgefest:

Main Stage:

Nickelback
Cake
Finger Eleven
Goldfinger
Default
Sevendust
Simple Plan
Jerry Cantrell

Silverchair were originally scheduled to perform but cancelled because of lead singer Daniel Johns' reoccurring reactive arthritis.

Second stage:

Danny Michel
The Dears
The Full Nine
Grade
Headstrong
Melissa Auf Der Maur's Hand of Doom
Mudmen
Not By Choice
Robin Black and The Intergalactic Rock Stars
The Weekend
GrimSkunk
Tuuli
Custom

Third Stage:

30 Seconds to Mars 
Billy Talent
Joel Plaskett
Grindig
Three Days Grace
Trouser
Theory of a Deadman
Flashlight Brown
Flicker
Epidemic
The Trews
Greenwheel
Injected
One 976
Jersey

Fourth Stage:

Sudden
Microbunny
Al Okada
Alistair
Abs & Fase
Ghetto Concept
MistaCronks
G Stokes
Graph Nobel
Toy Box

Edgefest II:

Edmonton:

Simple Plan
Gob
Bif Naked
LiveonRelease

Ottawa:

Bif Naked
Simple Plan
Tuuli
Flashlight Brown

Grand Bend:

The Watchmen
Sam Roberts
Crush
The Weekend

Montreal:

Slayer
Soulfly
In Flames
Downthesun

London:

Matthew Good
Bif Naked
Flashlight Brown

Vancouver:

Slayer
Soulfly
In Flames
Downthesun

Halifax:

Matthew Good
Sloan
De La Soul
The New Deal
Crush
Rascalz
Swollen Members
The Mighty Mighty Bosstones 
The Lowest Of The Low
Blackout 77
Creeper
Project Wyze

An Edgefest II in Toronto featuring Jimmy Eat World, Gob, Constantines, Midtown, Hot Rod Circuit, Moneen and Hot Hot Heat was scheduled but was cancelled due to scheduling difficulties.

2003
Location: Molson Park, Barrie.

Date: September 6, 2003.

The Tragically Hip
Our Lady Peace
Stereophonics
Sloan
Fefe Dobson
Finger Eleven
Thornley
Jersey

2004
Location: Molson Amphitheatre, Toronto.

Date: July 2, 2004.

Good Charlotte
Finger Eleven
Billy Talent
Jet
Alexisonfire
Something Corporate
Jersey
The Salads

2005
Location: Molson Amphitheatre, Toronto.

Date: July 1, 2005.

Main Stage:

Billy Talent
Alexisonfire
Rise Against
Story of the Year
Coheed and Cambria

2006
Location: Molson Amphitheatre, Toronto.

Dates: July 1 (Edgefest I), July 16 (Edgefest II).

Edgefest I:

Main Stage:

Our Lady Peace
Keane
Hot Hot Heat
Neverending White Lights 
Mobile
Evans Blue

Next Big Thing Stage:

Magneta Lane
Die Mannequin
Jets Overhead
Dearly Beloved
Pedestrian
The Illuminati

Edgefest II:

Main Stage:

Yellowcard
The All-American Rejects
Hawthorne Heights
Story Of The Year
Matchbook Romance
Illscarlett
Anberlin

Next Big Thing Stage:

The Meligrove Band
Magneta Lane
The Miniatures
Panic and The Rebel Emergency
In-Flight Safety
Tokyo Police Club

The Bedlam Society/Dine Alone/Distort Stage:

The Junction
Cancer Bats
Attack in Black
Johnny Truant

2008
Location: Downsview Park, Toronto.

Date: July 12, 2008.

Linkin Park
Stone Temple Pilots
Sam Roberts
The Bravery
Ashes Divide
Attack in Black
Arkells
The Coast
Creature
The Flatliners
Hostage Life
Modernboys Moderngirls
The Stereohoax
Sweet Thing
Ubiquitous Synergy Seeker
Alpha Galates

2009
Location: Downsview Park, Toronto.

Date: June 20, 2009.

Billy Talent
AFI
Alexisonfire
Metric
K-OS
The Stills
Arkells
Beast
Clothes Make the Man
Dean Lickyer
Dinosaur Bones
Flash Lightnin'
La Casa Muerte
The Midway State
Moneen
Still Life Still
The Waking Eyes

2011
Location: Downsview Park, Toronto.

Date: July 9, 2011.

Main Stage:

Rise Against
A Perfect Circle
The Weakerthans
Tokyo Police Club
Arkells
The Reason
Dinosaur Bones

Second Stage:

Hollerado
KO
Gentlemen Husbands
Harlan Pepper
Michou
Mockingbird Wish Me Luck
Monster Truck
Sandman Viper Command
The Sheepdogs

2012
Location: Downsview Park, Toronto.

Date: July 14, 2012.

Main Stage:

Death From Above 1979
Billy Talent
Silversun Pickups
The Pack A.D.
The Sheepdogs
Young the Giant
The Dirty Heads
Ubiquitous Synergy Seeker

Side Stage:

The Darcys
Said the Whale
Library Voices
The Balconies
Acres of Lions
The Coppertone
Hacienda
Indian Handcrafts
Whale Tooth
Yukon Blonde

2013
Location: Downsview Park, Toronto.

Date: July 31, 2013.

Main Stage:

The Lumineers
Band of Horses
The Neighbourhood
Monster Truck
Mother Mother
Dinosaur Bones
July Talk

Side Stage:

Capital Cities
Twin Forks
Great Bloomers
Hey Marseilles
You Won't
Imaginary Cities
Lucius
The Treble
The Treasures

2014
Location: TD Echo Beach, Toronto.

Dates: July 1 (Edgefest 1), July 18 (Edgefest 2), August 16 (Edgefest 3).

Edgefest 1:

The Sheepdogs
Monster Truck
Matt Mays
Head of the Herd

Emerging Artist Stage:

The Zolas
Royal Canoe
Teenage Kicks

Edgefest 2:

Ubiquitous Synergy Seeker
MS MR
Said the Whale
Bear Hands

Emerging Artist Stage: 

Wildlife
Dear Rouge

Edgefest 3:

Our Lady Peace
Sloan
I Mother Earth
Eve 6

2015
Location: TD Echo Beach, Toronto.

Dates: July 23 (Edgefest 1), July 29 (Edgefest 2), August 15 (Edgefest 3).

Edgefest 1:

Milky Chance
Elle King
X Ambassadors

Emerging Artist Stage:
 
The Zolas
The Franklin Electric
JJ and the Pillars

Edgefest 2:

Incubus
Deftones
The Bots

Emerging Artist Stage:

Brothers of North
XPrime

Edgefest 3:

Mother Mother
Kongos
Scott Helman

Emerging Artist Stage: 

Coleman Hell
K.I.D
Bestie
Gray

References

Edgefest